William Brian Jordan, Baron Jordan,  (born 28 January 1936), known as Bill Jordan, is a British economist and Labour politician.

The son of Walter and Alice Jordan, he was educated at the Barford Road Secondary Modern School in Birmingham.
  	
Jordan was President of the Amalgamated Engineering Union (AEU), and then its successor, the Amalgamated Engineering and Electrical Union (AEEU), from 1986 to 1994. During the same time, he was a member of the Trades Union Congress (TUC) General Council. In 1995, he became General Secretary of the International Confederation of Free Trade Unions (ICFTU), a post he held until 2002.
  	
He was also a long-serving Governor of the London School of Economics from 1987 to 2002, and of the BBC from 1988 to 1998.

Jordan was appointed a Commander of the Order of the British Empire (CBE) in the 1992 New Year Honours, and was created a life peer with the title Baron Jordan, of Bournville in the County of West Midlands, on 5 June 2000.

Since 1958, Lord Jordan has been married to Jean Ann Livesey; they have three daughters, nine grandchildren and three great-grandchildren.

References

1936 births
Commanders of the Order of the British Empire
General Secretaries of the International Confederation of Free Trade Unions
Labour Party (UK) life peers 
Living people
Members of the General Council of the Trades Union Congress
Presidents of the Amalgamated Engineering Union
Presidents of the Amalgamated Engineering and Electrical Union
Life peers created by Elizabeth II